James Furstenburg (born 23 June 1959) is a South African cricketer. He played in 38 first-class and 5 List A matches from 1979/80 to 1993/94.

References

External links
 

1959 births
Living people
South African cricketers
Eastern Province cricketers
Griqualand West cricketers
Northerns cricketers
People from Klerksdorp